Nripen Goswami is an Indian politician. He was elected to the Lok Sabha, lower house of the Parliament of India from Nowgong, Assam in 1998 as a member of the Indian National Congress.

References

External links
 Official biographical sketch in Parliament of India website

1942 births
India MPs 1998–1999
Assam politicians
Indian National Congress politicians
Living people
Lok Sabha members from Assam
Indian National Congress politicians from Assam